Lawrence Rogers Blinks (22 April 1900- 4 March 1989) was an American biologist with research interests in photosynthesis and electrophysiology. He served as the editor of the Annual Review of Plant Physiology (now the Annual Review of Plant Biology) for 1956.

Life and education 
Lawrence Rogers Blinks was born in Michigan City, Indiana on 22 April 1900 to parents Walter Moulton Blinks and Ella Little (Rogers) Blinks. He attended Kalamazoo College and Stanford University, before attending Harvard University where he was awarded a BS in 1923 and MA in 1925. He also completed his PhD at Harvard in 1926 under the direction of Winthrop Osterhout. Blinks married botanist Anne Catherine Hof in 1928 and they had one son. At age 88, Lawrence Blinks  died on March 22, 1989 in Pacific Grove, California.

Career 
After graduation, Blinks continued to work with Osterhout at the Bermuda Biological Station and Rockefeller Institute. In 1933, he joined the faculty of Stanford University and worked on the main campus before serving the director of Stanford's Hopkins Marine Station in Pacific Grove from 1943-1965. After retiring from Stanford, he worked as a visiting professor at UC Santa Cruz from 1966-1973 and helped to develop the new UC campus's Department of Biological Sciences.

Awards 
 Guggenheim Fellowship (1939, 1948)
 Fellow of the American Academy of Arts and Sciences (1949)
 American Society of Plant Biology Stephen Hales Award (1952)
 Member of the National Academy of Sciences (1955)
 Fulbright Scholarship (1957)

References 

1900 births
1989 deaths
Harvard University alumni
American phycologists
Stanford University faculty
People from Pacific Grove, California
People from Michigan City, Indiana
Annual Reviews (publisher) editors